The Great Canadian Holiday Baking Show is a Christmas special edition of The Great Canadian Baking Show.  Episodes have featured bakers from previous seasons of The Great Canadian Baking Show competing in season baking challenges to be named "Star Holiday Baker".  Three episodes of the The Great Canadian Holiday Baking Show have aired, in 2019, 2021, and 2022 respectively.

2019

The first episode of The Great Canadian Holiday Baking Show aired on November 13, 2019.  It featured four bakers from the show's first two seasons returning to compete in seasonal baking challenges.

This marked the final episode of hosts Carolyn Taylor and Aurora Browne in their presenting roles.

Bakers

Bakes
For the signature challenge, the bakers had two and a half hours to produce 12 edible ornament cookies. The technical challenge gave the bakers three hours to create a challah and accompany it with homemade butter and apple butter. The bakers' showstopper challenge was to construct an elaborate, edible, and structurally-sound Christmas village in four hours.

2021

A second episode of The Great Canadian Holiday Baking Show aired on December 12, 2021.  It featured four finalists from the show's first three seasons returning to compete in seasonal baking challenges.

Ann Pornel and Alan Shane Lewis, the hosts since season 4 of The Great Canadian Baking Show, appeared as presenters.

Bakers

Bakes
For the signature challenge, the bakers had to make a festive baking tray with two different types of desserts in two and a half hours.  The technical challenge gave the bakers one hour and 45 minutes to make a vínarterta, a seven layered cake of alternating layers of almond biscuit and prune jam, originally brought to Manitoba by Icelandic settlers. The bakers' showstopper challenge was to create a choux wreath with incredible flavours and elaborate decorations in four hours.

2022

A third episode of The Great Canadian Holiday Baking Show aired on November 27, 2022.  The episode featured returning bakers from the second, fourth, and fifth seasons to compete in seasonal baking challenges.

Ann Pornel and Alan Shane Lewis returned as presenters.

Bakers

Bakes
In the signature challenge, the bakers had two hours to make 18 savoury appetizers, 9 each of two different types for a holiday party platter.  For the technical challenge, they were tasked with baking 20 gefüllte herzen, traditional German heart-shaped soft gingerbread cookies, with a layer of thick raspberry jam within, coated in dark chocolate and drizzled with white chocolate, in 2 hours and 15 minutes.  For the showstopper, the bakers were given four hours to create a grand and impressive holiday scene cake, telling any holiday story or tradition, with the bakers being allowed to use any technique and additional bakes.

References

Holiday
2019 in Canadian television
2021 in Canadian television
2022 in Canadian television
Christmas television specials